Katori can refer to:

Places
Katori, Chiba, a city in Japan
Katori District, Chiba
Katori Shrine
Katori Station, junction passenger railway station 
Katori Sea, was an inland sea

People
Katori Masaru, author
Hidetoshi Katori, physicist
Shingo Katori, actor, singer, member of the Japanese idol group SMAP

Ships
Japanese ship Katori
, a battleship launched in 1905 and scrapped in 1924
, an ocean liner and troop ship completed in 1913 and sunk in 1941
Katori Maru, a cargo ship launched in 1938 and sunk in 1945
, a cruiser launched in 1939 and sunk in 1944
, a training ship commissioned in 1969 and withdrawn in 1998

Other
Tenshin Shōden Katori Shintō-ryū, a Japanese martial art named after the Katori Shrine

Japanese-language surnames